The Olympic and Commonwealth Games Association of Malawi (IOC code: MAW) is the National Olympic Committee representing Malawi.

See also
Malawi at the Olympics
Malawi at the Commonwealth Games

Malawi
Malawi
 
1968 establishments in Mauritius
Olympic
Sports organizations established in 1968
Malawi at the Commonwealth Games